Sejães is a Portuguese hamlet that is located in the parish of Terroso, Póvoa de Varzim. It is located in the opposite side of the village of Terroso in Cividade Hill.

Villages in Portugal